The Province of Agrigento (officially Libero Consorzio Comunale di Agrigento) is a province in the autonomous island region of Sicily in Italy, situated on its south-western coast. Following the suppression of the Sicilian provinces, it was replaced in 2015 by the Free municipal consortium of Agrigento. There are 43 comunes in the province.

History and location 

It is surrounded by Province of Palermo in the north, Trapani in the west, Mediterranean Sea in the south, and Caltanissetta in the east. Gela inhabitants founded the province in the 6th century B.C. as Akragas. The Carthage destroyed the province in 406 B.C. but was later ruled by the Romans, Goths, Byzantines, and Arabs. The Arabs rebuilt several parts of the province. Several ancient Doric temples were constructed during the 6th and 5th century B.C. to worship Hercules, Olympian Jupiter, Juno, Castor, Pollux, and Demeter. They are located in the Valley of Temples (Italian: Valle dei Templi). The ancient temples and other architectural structures were built using the stones of the hills near Capo San Marco.

Places  
Here below are listed the towns of the province with more than 10,000 inhabitants:

 Agrigento (58,273);
 Sciacca (40,068);
 Licata (36,113);
 Canicattì (35,530);
 Favara (31,751);
 Palma di Montechiaro (22,262);
 Ribera (18,492);
 Porto Empedocle (16,300);
 Raffadali (12,550);
 Menfi (12,262);
 Ravanusa (11,108).

Agrigento is the birthplace of the noted writer Luigi Pirandello and the philosopher Empedocles. According to the government records the number of unemployed people is about 17% of the total labour force. The province faces the Channel of Sicily in the south and is known for its beaches. Torre Salsa's beaches have been designated natural reserves and are protected due to their environmental importance.

Wine production 

The province is well known for its vineyards and wines. The total area covered by vineyards in 1984 was almost triple to that in 1949. During this period Marsala based wine merchants used the grapes produced in the province to produce Marsala wine. In 1984 the local government passed a law that regulated this practice. Around three-quarters of the Sicilian land devoted to growing Fiano grapes is in the province. Some of the important municipalities known for their vineyards include Sambuca di Sicilia, Menfi, and Santa Margherita di Belice.

Transportation 

The road network in the province comprises 540 km. of street roads, 1,000 km. of provincial roads, 260 km. of communal roads and 56 km. of regional roads. 55% of the total rail network is suitable for electric trains.

References

Bibliography
 

 
Agrigento